Sandie Thibaut (born 2 August 1996) is a French female BMX rider, representing her nation at international competitions. She competed in the time trial event and race event at the 2015 UCI BMX World Championships.

References

External links
 
 

1996 births
Living people
BMX riders
French female cyclists
European Games competitors for France
Cyclists at the 2015 European Games
Sportspeople from Strasbourg
Cyclists from Grand Est